Pachychilon is a genus of cyprinid fish found in Europe. There are two recognized species in this genus.

Species 
 Pachychilon macedonicum (Steindachner, 1892)
 Pachychilon pictum (Heckel & Kner, 1858) (Albanian roach)

References 

 

 
Cyprinidae genera

Taxonomy articles created by Polbot